Amerika Samoa Bank (ASB) was a financial institution established in 1979 in American Samoa and the second-largest bank in the territory with a 44 percent market share. At one point, it had one overseas branch in Honolulu that it opened in 1997 to serve Samoans in Hawaii.

In 1999, Australia and New Zealand Banking Group (ANZ) acquired ASB and renamed it ANZ Amerika Samoa Bank (ANZ ASB). The process was completed by 2001. ANZ ASB has two branches in Samoa and 10 ATMs. In 2010, it launched an internet banking service.

References

Sources 
Tschoegl, A.E. 2005. Foreign Banks in the Pacific: A Note. Journal of Pacific History.

Defunct banks of the United States
Australia and New Zealand Banking Group
Banks established in 1979
Banks based in American Samoa